The Wisconsin Avenue Limited Line, designated Route 37, is a weekday peak-hour bus route operated by the Washington Metropolitan Area Transit Authority between Friendship Heights station of the Red Line of the Washington Metro and Archives station of the Green and Yellow Lines of the Washington Metro. The line operates every 15–22 minutes during the weekday peak hours only in the peak direction only. Route 37 trips are roughly 45 minutes long. This route provides limited stop service along Pennsylvania Avenue and Wisconsin Avenue supplementing routes 31, and 33.

Background
Route 37 operates during weekday rush hours only in the peak direction between Friendship Heights station and Archives station mostly along Wisconsin Avenue and Massachusetts Avenue. The line provides limited stop service to supplement routes 30N, 30S, 31, and 33 during the weekday peak-hours along the busy Wisconsin Avenue corridor.

Route 37 currently operates out of Montgomery division. It did, however, operate out of Western division until 2017.

History
Route 37 originally operated as the Wisconsin Avenue Express Line which ran under a similar routing to route 37. The line originally operated between Washington Union Station and Friendship Heights station, then later between Friendship Heights and Archives station. Around the 1990s the line was shortened from Friendship Heights to Tenleytown–AU station. The line was later discontinued in 1996 and replaced by routes 30, 32, 34, 35, and 36.

In 2008, WMATA announced a study on the current 30s lines in order to simplify the line, improve services, reduce delays and bus bunchings. As of 2008, the 30s line has more than 20,000 passengers a day.

Reincarnation
On June 29, 2008, route 37 was reincarnated into service to operate as the Wisconsin Avenue Limited Line in order to provide limited-stop service between Friendship Heights station and Archives station primarily along the Wisconsin Avenue and Massachusetts Avenue corridors.

The new route 37 replaced route 30 which operated between Friendship Heights and Potomac Avenue station, a new route 39 provided limited stop service along the Pennsylvania Avenue corridor, and routes 31, 32, 36, and M5 replaced the 30, 34, and 35.

2010s
During the 2010s, route 37 was slightly rerouted to instead turn onto Jennifer street and instead terminate at the intersection of Western Avenue and Wisconsin Avenue instead of terminating along Jennifer street to let passengers board/alight closer to the Friendship Heights station entrance along Western Avenue.

Proposed elimination
In 2019 during WMATA's FY2021 budget proposal, WMATA proposed to eliminate the 37 in order to reduce costs and alternative service at most stops. According to performance measures, the 37 averages 450 riders per weekday, 48% of riders can make exact same trip on other routes, and the farebox recovery is 14.6% (the system average is 34.3%). One of the reasons the 37 declines in ridership is due to it skipping Georgetown where ridership is high in the areas for the 30s line. WMATA later backed out the proposals due to customer pushback on April 2, 2020.

The proposed elimination was brought back up on September 26, 2020 due to low federal funding. Route 37 has not operated since March 13, 2020 due to Metro's response to the COVID-19 pandemic.

References

2008 establishments in Washington, D.C.
37